Hubbard High School is a small 2A high school located in Hubbard, Texas (USA). It is part of the Hubbard Independent School District located in southeastern Hill County. In 2011, the school was rated "Academically Acceptable" by the Texas Education Agency.

Athletics
The Hubbard Jaguars compete in the following sports:

Baseball
Basketball
Football
Golf
Powerlifting
Softball
Tennis
Track and Field
Volleyball

Activities
Students can also be involved in band, cheerleading, drill team, One Act Play, yearbook, student council, FCA, FFA, FCCLA, and UIL amongst many others.

References

External links
Hubbard ISD

Schools in Hill County, Texas
Public high schools in Texas